In mathematical logic and descriptive set theory, the analytical hierarchy is an extension of the arithmetical hierarchy. The analytical hierarchy of sets classifies sets by the formulas that can be used to define them; it is the lightface version of the projective hierarchy.

The analytical hierarchy of formulas 
The notation 
indicates the class of formulas in the language of second-order arithmetic with number quantifiers but no set quantifiers. This language does not contain set parameters. The Greek letters here are lightface symbols, which indicate this choice of language. Each corresponding boldface symbol denotes the corresponding class of formulas in the extended language with a parameter for each real; see projective hierarchy for details.

The analytical hierarchy of sets of natural numbers 
A set of natural numbers is assigned the classification  if it is definable by a  formula. The set is assigned the classification  if it is definable by a  formula. If the set is both  and  then it is given the additional classification .

The  sets are called hyperarithmetical. An alternate classification of these sets by way of iterated computable functionals is provided by the hyperarithmetical theory.

The analytical hierarchy on subsets of Cantor and Baire space 
The analytical hierarchy can be defined on any effective Polish space; the definition is particularly simple for Cantor and Baire space because they fit with the language of ordinary second-order arithmetic. Cantor space is the set of all infinite sequences of 0s and 1s; Baire space is the set of all infinite sequences of natural numbers. These are both Polish spaces.

The ordinary axiomatization of second-order arithmetic uses a set-based language in which the set quantifiers can naturally be viewed as quantifying over Cantor space. A subset of Cantor space is assigned the classification  if it is definable by a  formula. The set is assigned the classification  if it is definable by a  formula. If the set is both  and  then it is given the additional classification .

An equivalent definition of the analytical hierarchy on Baire space is given by defining the analytical hierarchy of formulas using a functional version of second-order arithmetic; then the analytical hierarchy on subsets of Cantor space can be defined from the hierarchy on Baire space. This alternate definition gives exactly the same classifications as the first definition.

Because Cantor space is homeomorphic to any finite Cartesian power of itself, and Baire space is homeomorphic to any finite Cartesian power of itself, the analytical hierarchy applies equally well to finite Cartesian power of one of these spaces.
A similar extension is possible for countable powers and to products of powers of Cantor space and powers of Baire space.

Extensions 
As is the case with the arithmetical hierarchy, a relativized version of the analytical hierarchy can be defined. The language is extended to add a constant set symbol A. A formula in the extended language is inductively defined to be  or  using the same inductive definition as above.

Examples 
(Not to be confused with the general case for well-founded relations on sets, see Lévy hierarchy)
 The set of all natural numbers which are indices of computable ordinals is a  set which is not .
 A function  is definable by Herbrand's 1931 formalism of systems of equations iff  is hyperarithmetical.
In fact, this set is not  for any element  of Baire space.
If the axiom holds then there is also a  well ordering of Cantor space.

Properties 
For each  we have the following strict containments:

,
,
,
.

Care is required to distinguish this usage from the term analytic set which has a different meaning, namely .

Table

See also 
 Arithmetical hierarchy
 Levy hierarchy

References 

 
 

Computability theory
Effective descriptive set theory
Hierarchy
Mathematical logic hierarchies